How to Argue with an Economist: Reopening Political Debate in Australia is a 2002 book by Lindy Edwards which is in its second edition as of May 2007.  In this book, Edwards explores the role of economics in society, as well as the influence of  "economic rationalism" on Australian politics. Edwards argues that this economic view overlooks important social issues and explains how, in her opinion, it has transformed Australian culture.

Lindy Edwards is a former economic adviser in the Australian Prime Minister's Department.

References

2002 non-fiction books
Australian non-fiction books
Books about politics of Australia
Books about economic policy
Books about philosophy of economics
Cambridge University Press books